Friedrich Karl "Fritz" von Loßberg (30 April 1868 – 4 May 1942) was a German colonel and later general, of the First World War. He was an operational planner, especially of defence, who served as chief of staff in the 2nd, 3rd and 4th armies. He was present at the Battle of the Somme, the Battle of Arras and the Third Battle of Ypres.

Loßberg was born in Bad Homburg in Hesse-Nassau. Erich Ludendorff referred to him as Loszberg in his memoirs. English-speaking sources often spell his name Lossberg. Loßberg was later to become "legendary as the fireman of the Western Front, always sent by the OHL to the area of crisis".

He was the "foremost German expert on Defensive Warfare. Was made a floating chief of staff during crises, with  the right to issue orders in a superior's name". In Military Operations France and Belgium 1917 part I, Cyril Falls, the British official historian, referred to him as "a very remarkable soldier". Loßberg was one of the leading proponents of the system of defence-in-depth.

Early life and the first years of World War I
Loßberg was born into a military family in 1868. His father, Viktor von Loßberg, was a Prussian Generalmajor. Loßberg was commissioned in the 2nd Guards Regiment as an officer in 1888; the third generation of his family to serve in it. He qualified as a general staff officer and in 1911 became an instructor at the War Academy. He was appointed chief of staff of the XIII (Royal Württemberg) Corps in 1913; in 1914 it fought on the Western Front and Eastern Front. He already knew the supreme commander, Erich von Falkenhayn, as well as the chief of operations and other members of the staff, while the Kaiser remembered him as "the fencing lieutenant in Berlin".

On the Western Front, the defenders were massed in the front line and instructed to "Hold what you are ordered to hold". Some of the OHL staff foresaw that with more guns and ammunition, the French and British preliminary bombardments would soon be converting their crowded front line into a slaughterhouse. Their thinking was stimulated by instructions captured from the French Fifth Army in May 1915 stipulating three lines of defence. The first line was manned by sentry groups, with listening posts in front. It was to be strongly built but lightly garrisoned. If attackers broke through they would face a second, main line of resistance, which included dugouts to accommodate all of the defenders of the first two lines. A third line incorporated shell-proof shelters for the reserves with the artillery just behind it. The OHL staff colonels Max Bauer and Bussche and captains Hermann Geyer and Harbou favoured defence in depth and discussed making it flexible by permitting the garrison of the front line to retreat to join the main line of resistance if the front was breached. Loßberg argued against elasticity, because he had been impressed in battle by the demoralising effect of fleeing men.

Chief of staff

3rd Army

The German 3rd Army was driven out of the front line and the chief of staff proposed to withdraw  further, to shelter behind a river. He was replaced by Loßberg; as he arrived at army headquarters he was telephoned by a corps commander asking whether they would still withdraw that night. Loßberg ordered him to stand fast; a few minutes later he met his commander, General Karl von Einem, who endorsed the cancellation and agreed that Loßberg might go immediately to the front with full powers. The French were sure to attack again once they had moved their artillery forward. When Loßberg arrived at the heights on the north side of the valley, he was immediately struck by the strength of the position they had been forced to occupy. They were now defending a reserve trench on a reverse slope  beneath the crest. The line was hidden from French observation and the defenders could shoot down attackers as they emerged over the crest. Its flaw was that the German artillery observers, usually placed in the front line, were also blind. Loßberg ordered the observers to set up their positions along the crest where he was standing, which gave them a perfect view of the slope opposite where attackers would appear and they would no longer work in the noisy, smoky confusion of the front line during an attack. The reserves were placed just behind the northern hill, where Loßberg ordered shelters to be built for them. Pickets were dotted along the crest of the hill facing the French. These depositions fit perfectly to his belief that the "Strength of the defense lies in concealment from enemy observation". Then he motored to the headquarters of each of his corps to direct them to position their lines similarly. The new defensive line contained further French attacks.

2nd Army

When the British and French attacked at the opening of the Battle of the Somme, Falkenhayn summoned Loßberg to his bedside at 01:00 to ask him to take over as chief of staff of the 2nd Army where the French and British had penetrated. Loßberg would agree only if the German attacks at the Battle of Verdun were stopped. Falkenhayn shook hands—but never kept his promise. At the 2nd Army headquarters its commander, Fritz von Below, gave Loßberg permission to go to front with full power to issue orders. When Loßberg saw how the original front line trenches had been utterly demolished by the Anglo-French barrage, he ordered the defenders to stand where they were but to adopt a mobile defence in depth. The front line was to be held lightly, with the defenders moving forward into shell holes as soon as a bombardment began. The artillery observers were moved behind the main line of resistance to higher ground where the reserves for the battalion holding the sector were also sheltered. Enemy penetrations would be driven back by counter-attacks. If possible, an immediate counter-attack would be launched by the two reserve battalions of the regiment holding the sector. It would be led by the front-line battalion commander, who knew the conditions best. Close behind the front Loßberg stationed counter-attack divisions. In Loßberg's system, corps, which had contained a set trio of divisions, became responsible for the length of front held by three divisions: the divisions making up the corps were changed if necessary but the corps remained responsible for its terrain. If an attack threatened, Loßberg tried to be in the front line at daybreak to gauge morale. Most days Below and Loßberg visited a section of the front, except during attacks, when they had to be at the telephone exchange. They were careful to relieve divisions when they were exhausted.

After Hindenburg and Ludendorff took over the OHL on 29 August 1916, Loßberg was delighted to watch the spirit of the army revive. The German attacks on Verdun were stopped immediately. Unlike their predecessors Helmuth von Moltke the Younger and Falkenhayn, the new team solicited and freely discussed ideas. Loßberg was asked for a report describing his defensive tactics. It was built with all recent refinements, including shallow dugouts with concrete roofs that could be left quickly when attacks began. When Loßberg motored through the position he saw that the artillery observation posts were built into the front line trenches on a forward slope, exposed to enemy ground observers. Supported by Below and Crown Prince Rupprecht of Bavaria the army group commander, Loßberg argued for building a new line ahead of the existing position, on reverse slopes, with positions for a thinly manned outpost line on the crest, which meant that the artillery observers were in the old first line, now the new second line, overlooking the front position. The OHL issued a paper the "Conduct of the Defensive Battle" on 1 December 1916. Mostly written by junior staff officers, it incorporated many of Loßberg's ideas for mobile defence in depth but also recommended elasticity: permitting the defenders of the front line to retreat if forced. Loßberg still strongly opposed elasticity in his report published by the OHL on 30 January 1917.

6th Army

The British attacked the 6th Army near Arras on 9 April 1917, advancing behind a creeping barrage for almost , capturing Vimy Ridge, which gave their observers a commanding view over the Douai Plain. On 11 April, Loßberg was made chief of staff of the 6th Army. He found the defenders in chaos but in the Crown Prince Rupprecht's words he was "almost superhumanly imperturbable". He swiftly organised new defensive lines, telephoning Ludendorff that this time the defence would be elastic because the front line was so readily observed. If necessary the front line defenders would withdraw and the battle would be fought at the second line, which was mostly on a reverse slope, easily watched by German artillery observers. Counter-attacking infantry were now using stormtrooper tactics. When reserve divisions advanced from the artillery protection line to counter-attack, they came under the command of the division they were supporting. More British attacks gained no significant ground.

4th Army

After the Battle of Messines (7–14 June 1917), Ludendorff asked Loßberg to move to Flanders as chief of staff of the 4th Army (General Friedrich Sixt von Armin). Loßberg knew the topography of the Ypres Salient from 1914. For the first time he could organise a defence in depth before an attack began. He strove to make the defenders invisible to attackers and even to their aerial observers. The defenders were provided with boards so they could shelter above the ground water that filled the bottoms of the holes and with corrugated iron and canvas for crude roofs. They were to fight to the end from these holes with their light machine-guns. The second position was about  behind the front, near the effective limit of the British and French field guns. It had concrete nests for heavy machine guns and shelters for riflemen, mortar crews and light machine-gunners but if the attackers broke through, most of the defenders moved into shell holes so they could engage the attackers from unexpected directions. They were to hold their positions even if their line was penetrated. Before attackers reached the artillery protection line, they would be met by counter-attacks from the reserve regiment. The 14-day, 6-million-shell bombardment ended on 31 July 1917. By noon the British were penetrating the second position, when counter-attacks in the centre of the attack front pushed them back to the British second objective as it began to rain, the start of an unusually wet and cool August. The day after the attack, Loßberg was promoted to major-general.

On 16 August, the British attacked again but with orders to advance only  before digging in to repel counter-attacks. The attack failed on the Gheluvelt Plateau and the offensive was eventually suspended for three weeks to repair communications. On 20 September the British attacked again after a three-week dry spell, drove back the Germans on the Gheluvelt Plateau and destroyed German counter-attacks. Attacks on 26 September and 4 October were equally effective. Such bite and hold tactics forced the Germans to change. Ludendorff, who increasing directed the defence, placed more men in the foremost line and waited until the following day to mount a methodical counter-attack. The British artillery overwhelmed the foremost defenders and their immediate supports. On 7 October the Germans returned to a lightly held front which would retire to the main resistance line where they would be joined by counter-attack troops, while a dense artillery barrage would be laid in front of the main resistance line. After Ludendorff took responsibility, Loßberg does not describe the further changes in his book, which was based on a diary.

Their final configuration was that each front division should establish a main line of resistance  behind the front. It consisted of strong points which would hold out even if the line was breached. Heavy machine-guns, working in pairs, were just behind this position, along with a few field guns as anti-tank weapons. The battle zone extended to a depth of  behind the front; it was dotted with points of resistance that if necessary would be held until relieved by the counter-attack. Since the maximum range of field artillery was  attackers nearing the end of the battle zone could only be supported by their heavier guns. A reserve division was in position close behind this battle zone. If it launched a counter-attack it was led by the commander of the division at the front. This defensive doctrine was carried over after the end of World War I. After enormous sacrifice, by bite and hold, the British took Passchendaele Ridge on 10 November 1917. Now they faced another strong line of German field works while still another behind that was close to completion.

1918

Loßberg wrote little in his memoirs about 1918, the year in which the Germans launched their astonishing breakthrough offensives on the Western Front, starting with Operation Michael which forced back the British near Cambrai. It created a vast salient that increased the length of the German defensive front but failed to take any strategic objective. Loßberg urged the OHL to withdraw from the useless but costly salient but they did not. The next offensive was by the 4th Army in Flanders, in which Loßberg was chief of staff, at the Battle of the Lys. There was another tactical success, which after the initial successes was stalled by reserves manning a stout mobile defence in depth. On Loßberg's advice they stopped attacking even though they had not reached the railway junction that was their objective.

The OHL shifted the attack to Champagne, to draw away the French troops who had been sent to help the British in Flanders. The German advance in the Third Battle of the Aisne was the most remarkable yet, they reached the right bank of the River Marne, only  from Paris, which the French government prepared to evacuate. The OHL decided that they must enlarge this salient, so they would be able to bring forward enough supplies to drive on to Paris. On part of the sector assaulted the French front line was lightly held and easily overrun but as they thrust forward the attackers unexpectedly encountered the main line of resistance, beyond the range of the German field guns, where they were stopped.

The OHL decided to strike again in Flanders, to finish off the British. Ludendorff came on 18 July 1918 to discuss the next operation with the commanders there, including Rupprecht and Loßberg, who found Ludendorff "aggressive and confident". His mood was shattered by a telephone call reporting that the French and Americans had smashed through the right flank of the salient pointing toward Paris, on the opening day of the Battle of Soissons. Everyone in the room realised that they had lost the war. There were no more German attacks; the OHL was forced slowly to withdraw towards the German border, hoping to establish a shorter defensive line that could be held. First they had to evacuate all of their wounded, then essential supplies like food and ammunition, and finally the fighting troops, who were being assaulted all along the front. They reorganised for withdrawing, on 8 August, Loßberg became chief of staff of Army Group von Böhn, made up of the 2nd, 18th, and 9th Armies. Early in November he was reassigned to the OHL. The Armistice specified that all German troops still remaining in France, Belgium, Luxembourg or Alsace-Lorraine after 14 days would become prisoners of war. They were all out in time, a final display of the organizational skill of the German staffs.

Post war
Then he became general chief of staff and later commanded the 6th Division. He retired in 1927 as a general of infantry and died in Lübeck on 14 May 1942. His son Bernhard was also a general staff officer, known for the Lossberg study for the invasion of Russia.

Decorations and awards
Loßberg was an honorary citizen of Bad Homburg, his town and received medals and decorations:
 Iron Cross of 1914, 1st and 2nd class
 Pour le Mérite (21 September 1916) with oak leaves (24 April 1917)
 Order of the Red Eagle, 4th class
 Order of the Crown, 3rd class (Prussia)
 Knight's Cross of the Royal House Order of Hohenzollern with Swords
 Service Award (Prussia)
 Honor Cross 2nd Class of the Princely House Order of Hohenzollern with Swords
 Knight's Cross of the Military Order of Max Joseph (Bavaria)
 Military Merit Order, 3rd class with Swords and Crown (Bavaria)
 Commander's Cross Second Class of the Military Order of St. Henry (Saxony)
 Knight's Cross Second Class of the Albert Order with Swords (Saxony)
 Commander of the Military Merit Order (Württemberg)
 Knight's Cross of the Order of the Crown (Württemberg)
 Commander Second Class of the Order of the Zähringer Lion (Baden)
 Bravery Medal (Hesse)
 Military Merit Cross, 2nd class (Mecklenburg-Schwerin)
 Knight's Cross, First Class of the Order of Henry the Lion
 Knight's Cross, First Class of the House and Merit Order of Peter Frederick Louis (Oldenburg)
 Commander of the Order of the White Falcon
 Hanseatic Cross of Bremen
 Commander, First Class of the Ducal Saxe-Ernestine House Order with Swords
 Cross for Merit in War (Saxe-Meiningen)

Footnotes

References

Books
 
 
 
 
 
 
 
 

Encyclopedias
 

Magazines
 

Theses

Further reading
  Translation of Meine Tätigkeit im Weltkriege 1914–1918 (Berlin, Ernst Siegfried Mittler und Sohn 1939)

External links
 Blue Max website
 
 
 Awarded Oakleaves Friedrich Karl von Loßberg, 24 April 1917
 Genealogy site

1868 births
1942 deaths
People from Bad Homburg vor der Höhe
Major generals of Prussia
German Army generals of World War I
Recipients of the Pour le Mérite (military class)
Knights of the Military Order of Max Joseph
Recipients of the Hanseatic Cross (Bremen)
Generals of Infantry (Reichswehr)
People from Hesse-Nassau
Military personnel from Hesse